Easy 96 (formerly RBC Radio) is a 24/7 subsidiary communications authority radio station providing South Asian-Indian American programming that serves New York City and the Tri-State area of neighboring  Northern New Jersey region, Connecticut, and parts of New York State.

History
Founded by Rohit Jagessar, an Indo-Guyanese American, RBC Radio began broadcasting on March 15, 1989. The first Asian-Indian radio station in the US, its first broadcasts were on PanAmSat Satellites (Intelsat) SAT COM R3, transponder 16 and on the 92 kHz subcarrier WNYE-FM, before moving to the 92 kHz subcarrier signal of The New York Times WQXR-FM, as well as on the AfriStar and AsiaStar Satellites covering four continents.

The station's rise in popularity in the Greater New York market took place mainly after it was launched on the New York Times subcarrier signal. It soon became the home for both Bollywood and Indo Caribbean artists to promote their latest films and music.

Maine Pyar Kiya, Dilwale Dulhania Le Jayenge, Hum Aapke Hain Koun, Kuch Kuch Hota Hai, Kabhi Khushi Kabhie Gham and Kaho Na Pyar Hai, are some of the most noted Bollywood film music that made their US debut on the station.

In addition to film music, hit songs such as Paree Hoon Mein, Made in India, San Ni Dha Pa, Bolo Ta Ra Ra, Vande Mataram and Sifir all had their US debut on the station.

Some of the singers that appeared in features and interviews on the station are Suneeta Rao, A. R. Rahman, Daler Mehndi, Sundar Popo, Alisha Chinai, Asha Bhosle, Kanchan, Sonu Nigam, Alka Yagnik, Rahat Fateh Ali Khan, Runa Laila, Kumar Sanu, Kavita Krishnamurti, Musarrat Nazir, Shaan, Udit Narayan, Amitabh Bachchan, Shankar Mahadevan, Hariharan and Jagjit Singh.

The station broadcasts in English, Hindi, Urdu, Bengali, Gujarati and Punjabi languages.

Mr. Rohit Jagessar has produced and hosted 37,960 hours of broadcasts for the station.

External links
 Official Website

Asian-American culture in Connecticut

Indian-American culture in New Jersey
Indian-American culture in New York City
Radio stations broadcasting on subcarriers
Foreign-language radio stations in the United States
1989 establishments in New York City